Louis-Ferdinand de Rocca Serra (7 February 1936 – 18 December 2021) was a French politician. A member of the Independent Republicans, he served in the Senate from 1994 to 2001.

References

1936 births
2021 deaths
20th-century French politicians
21st-century French politicians
French Senators of the Fifth Republic
Independent Republicans politicians
People from Corse-du-Sud